William Cranstoun may refer to:
 William Cranstoun, 1st Lord Cranstoun, Scottish Lord of Parliament
 William Cranstoun, 3rd Lord Cranstoun, Scottish Lord of Parliament